Lawyer Quince is a 1924 British comedy film directed by Manning Haynes and starring Moore Marriott, Cynthia Murtagh and Charles Ashton. It is based on a short story by W. W. Jacobs and is a remake of a 1914 film version.

Cast
 Moore Marriott - Quince
 Cynthia Murtagh - Celia Rose
 Charles Ashton - Ned Quince
 George Wynn - His Rival
 Johnny Butt - Farmer Rose
 J. Edwards Barker - Bully
 Ada Palmer - Widow

External links

1924 films
1924 comedy films
British comedy films
Films based on works by W. W. Jacobs
British black-and-white films
British silent short films
Films based on short fiction
1920s English-language films
Films directed by H. Manning Haynes
1920s British films
Silent comedy films